Churches in India is a general term used for Christian churches in India and may refer to:

General
Christianity in India
Saint Thomas Christians
Malabar Church (historic, general)
Malankara Church (historic, general)
Oriental Orthodoxy in India
Catholic Church in India
Protestantism in India
Eastern Orthodoxy in India

Eastern churches
Church of the East / Assyrian
India (East Syriac ecclesiastical province) (historical overview)
Chaldean Syrian Church (Assyrian Church of the East in India)
Oriental Orthodox
Jacobite Syrian Christian Church (Syriac Orthodox Church of India)
Malankara Orthodox Syrian Church (Indian Orthodox Church)
Eastern Catholic
Syro-Malabar Catholic Church
Syro-Malankara Catholic Church
Reformed/independent
Malabar Independent Syrian Church
Mar Thoma Syrian Church (Malankara Mar Thoma Syrian Church)
St. Thomas Evangelical Church of India
Malankara Evangelical Church

Western churches
Anglican Church of India, a part of the Continuing Anglican movement
Church of India, Burma and Ceylon (CIBC; later of India, Pakistan &c, CIPBC), the historic province of the Anglican Communion in British India
Church of North India (United Church, Protestant), and a successor of the CIPBC. Previously Church of the Brethren in India
Church of South India (United Church, Protestant), and a successor of the CIPBC
Evangelical Church of India, an extension of One Mission Society
Presbyterian Church of India
Reformed Presbyterian Church of India
South India Reformed Churches also known as Reformed Church of India

See also
Indian Church (disambiguation)
Communion of Churches in India - representative body of three mainland Protestant Churches in India: The Church of North India, The Church of South India, and the Malankara Mar Thoma Syrian Church (refer to above)
National Council of Churches in India
United Evangelical Lutheran Churches in India